This is a list of the number-one hits of 1965 on Italian Hit Parade Singles Chart.

See also
1965 in music
List of number-one hits in Italy

References

1965 in Italian music
1965 record charts
1965